Richard Dudley Obenshain (October 31, 1935 – August 2, 1978) was an American politician and attorney. Obenshain had served as the chairman of the Republican Party of Virginia, and was nominated in 1978 to run as the Republican nominee for the United States Senate, but died prior to the election.

Biography
Obenshain was the son of Josephine (Dudley) and Samuel S. Obenshain (1904–2000), a professor at Virginia Tech in Blacksburg, Virginia, where he grew up. The elder Obenshain was active in Virginia's Republican Party during the era of the Byrd Organization, the Democratic machine of Harry F. Byrd.

Richard graduated from Bridgewater College in Rockingham County, Virginia, and was admitted to the Virginia Bar. He was a delegate to the Republican National Convention in 1964. In that same year, he ran for the House of Representatives in  based in Richmond, facing Democratic State Delegate David E. Satterfield III. Obenshain nearly ended the long run of Democratic dominance in the district, losing by only 654 votes. He nearly won on the strength of Barry Goldwater carrying the district; Goldwater won every county-level jurisdiction in the district except for the city of Richmond. However, Republicans had been making inroads among Byrd Democrats for some time before then. As early as the 1930s, several Byrd Democrats had begun splitting their tickets for national elections due to the increasingly liberal bent of the national party.

Obenshain was the unsuccessful Republican candidate for Attorney General in 1969 and became chairman of the Republican Party of Virginia in 1972.

By this time, the Byrd Organization had lost its grip on state politics. In 1966, two longtime Byrd stalwarts Senator A. Willis Robertson and Congressman Howard W. Smith, were ousted by more liberal primary challengers, and Byrd's son, Harry Jr., barely survived a primary challenge for the right to finish out his father's sixth term. Despite this and Byrd Democrats' growing willingness to split their tickets, the GOP was still all but nonexistent at the state and local level; conservative Democrats still held most local offices and dominated the Virginia General Assembly. Under Obenshain's leadership, however, a record number of Republicans were elected to the General Assembly, the first such major gains since Reconstruction in the late 19th century following the American Civil War.

In the summer of 1978, Obenshain won his party's nomination to run for the U.S. Senate to replace retiring William L. Scott. On the night of August 2, the small twin-engine Piper PA-34 Seneca airplane carrying him home from a campaign appearance crashed in trees while attempting a night-time landing at the Chesterfield County Airport, a general aviation facility near Richmond. Killed along with the 42-year-old candidate were Richard Neal and a flight instructor.  Former U.S. Secretary of the Navy John Warner was selected to replace Richard Obenshain as the party's nominee for the U.S. Senate race.  He won in November, and went on to hold the seat for 30 years.

Children
In 2003, two of Richard Obenshain's children enjoyed major successes in Virginia politics. First, his daughter, Kate Obenshain of Winchester, became the first woman to head the Republican Party of Virginia. Coincidentally, her opponent was state Republican party treasurer Richard Neel Jr., an Alexandria lawyer whose father was the pilot who died in the same crash as Richard Obenshain. Then, in November, Obenshain's son, Mark Obenshain, an attorney based in Harrisonburg, was elected to the Virginia State Senate from the 26th district. He was the 2013 Republican nominee for Attorney General of Virginia.

Legacy
According to an article in the Virginian-Pilot newspaper, his political legacy was "skill at birthing an alliance of Republicans and conservative Democrats, his prescient support of Ronald Reagan and bold tax cuts, and his tireless crusade to curb Democratic dominance in the state."

In Richmond, the state headquarters of the Republican Party of Virginia is named "The Richard D. Obenshain Center" in his honor.

"The most important goal in my life is to have some significant impact in preserving personal freedom in the life of this country." 
Richard D. Obenshain

According to Virginia State Senator Mark Obenshain (R-26), the above statement is slightly misquoted and should read as the following:

"The most important goal in my life is to have some significant impact in preserving and expanding the realm of personal freedom in the life of this country."
Richard D. Obenshain

References

External links
 Library of Virginia - Richard D. Obenshain webpage

1936 births
1978 deaths
Accidental deaths in Virginia
Bridgewater College alumni
Candidates in the 1978 United States elections
20th-century American politicians
New Right (United States)
Politicians from Abingdon, Virginia
People from Blacksburg, Virginia
Republican Party of Virginia chairs
Victims of aviation accidents or incidents in 1978
Victims of aviation accidents or incidents in the United States
Virginia lawyers
Virginia Republicans
20th-century American lawyers